The nine-dash line, at various times also referred to as the ten-dash line and the eleven-dash line (by the ROC), is a set of line segments on various maps that accompanied the claims of the People's Republic of China (PRC, "mainland China") and the Republic of China (ROC, "Taiwan") in the South China Sea. The contested area in the South China Sea includes the Paracel Islands, the Spratly Islands, of which Taiping Island, the largest of the islands, is controlled by the ROC, and various other areas including Pratas Island and the Vereker Banks, the Macclesfield Bank, and the Scarborough Shoal. Certain places, known as the "Great Wall of Sand", have undergone land reclamation efforts by various states that claim the area, including the PRC, ROC, and Vietnam. The People's Daily of the PRC uses the term 断续线 or 南海断续线 (literally South Sea intermittent line), while the ROC-Taiwanese government uses the term 十一段線 (literally eleven-segment line).

A 1946 map showing a U-shaped eleven-dash line was first published by the Republic of China government on 1 December 1947. Two of the dashes in the Gulf of Tonkin were later removed at the behest of Premier Zhou Enlai of the PRC after a treaty with Vietnam, reducing the total to nine. However, the ROC government still uses the eleven-dash line. In 2013 some were surprised by a tenth dash to the east of Taiwan, but it had been present in PRC maps since as early as 1984.

On 12 July 2016, an arbitral tribunal constituted under the United Nations Convention on the Law of the Sea (UNCLOS) concluded that China's historic-rights claim over the maritime areas (as opposed to land territories and territorial waters) inside the nine-dash line has no lawful effect if it exceeds what it is entitled to under the UNCLOS. One of the arguments was that China had not exercised exclusive control over these waters and resources. It also clarified that it would not "rule on any question of sovereignty over land territory and would not delimit any maritime boundary between the Parties". The ruling was rejected by both the PRC and ROC governments. Other claimants in the South China Sea approved the ruling.

History

After the Sino-French War in 1885, China signed the Treaty of Tientsin with France, and renounced its suzerainty over Vietnam. On June 26, 1887, the Qing government signed the Convention Relating to the Delimitation of the Frontier between China and Tonkin, which did not clarify the water border between China and French Indo-China.

Following the defeat of Japan at the end of World War II, the Republic of China (ROC) claimed the entirety of the Paracels, Pratas and Spratly Islands after accepting the Japanese surrender of the islands based on the Cairo and Potsdam Declarations. However, under the 1943 Cairo Declaration and 1945 Potsdam Proclamation, ROC sovereignty over the archipelagos and waters of South China Sea was not stated.

In November 1946, the ROC sent naval ships to take control of these islands after the surrender of Japan. When the Peace Treaty with Japan was being signed at the San Francisco Conference, on 7 September 1951, both China and Vietnam asserted their rights to the islands. Later the Philippine government also laid claim to some islands of the archipelagos.

In December 1947, the Ministry of Interior of the Nationalist government released "Location Map of South Sea Islands" showing an eleven-dash line. Scholarly accounts place its publication from 1946 to 1948 and indicate that it originated from an earlier one titled "Map of Chinese Islands in the South China Sea" published by the ROC Land and Water Maps Inspection Committee in 1935. Beginning in 1952, the People's Republic of China (PRC) used a revised map with nine dashes, removing the two dashes in the Gulf of Tonkin. The change was interpreted as a concession to the newly independent North Vietnam; the maritime border between PRC and Vietnam in the Gulf of Tonkin was eventually formalized by treaty in 2000.

After evacuating to Taiwan in 1949, the ROC government continued to claim the eleven-dash line and it remains as the rationale for the Chinese Republic's claims to the Spratly and Paracel Islands. President Lee Teng-hui stated that "legally, historically, geographically, or in reality", all of the South China Sea and Spratly islands were ROC territory and under ROC sovereignty, and denounced actions undertaken there by Malaysia and the Philippines. Taiwan and China have the same claims and have cooperated with each other during international talks involving the Spratly islands.

In May 2009, Malaysia and Vietnam submitted claims to the UN Commission on the Limits of the Continental Shelf to extend their respective continental shelves. In objection, the PRC communicated two Notes Verbales to the UN Secretary General stating:

Its submissions were accompanied by maps depicting nine dashes in the South China Sea. Immediately afterwards, Malaysia and Vietnam protested China's submission. Indonesia followed suit a year later, and the Philippines two years later. In 2011, the PRC submitted another Notes Verbales to the UN conveying a similar message.

Although not visible on the 2009 map, modern Chinese maps since 1984, including the vertically oriented maps published in 2013 and 2014, have also included a tenth dash to the east of Taiwan. Some were nonetheless surprised when the tenth dash appeared in a 2013 map, even though it was not in the South China Sea. Meanwhile, the ROC (Taiwan) has rejected all rival claims to the Paracel islands, repeating its position that all of the Paracel, Spratly, Zhongsha (Macclesfield Bank grouped with Scarborough Shoal) and Pratas Island belong to the ROC along with "their surrounding waters and respective seabed and subsoil". Taiwan views other claims as illegitimate, releasing a statement through its Ministry of Foreign Affairs stating "there is no doubt that the Republic of China has sovereignty over the archipelagos and waters."

The nine-dash line has been used by China to show the maximum extent of its claim, without indicating how the dashes would be joined and in turn affect the area being claimed. The PRC has not otherwise clarified the legal basis or nature of the nine-dash line. Analysts from the U.S. Department of State posit three different explanations—that it indicates only the islands within are being claimed, that a maritime area including other features are being claimed, or that a claim is being made as historical waters of China. A claim to only the islands is most consistent with past PRC publications and statements, whereas the other two arguments would put China's claim at greater conflict with the UNCLOS.

Ongoing disputes 

According to former Philippine President Benigno Aquino III, "China's nine-dash line territorial claim over the entire South China Sea is against international laws, particularly the United Nations Convention of the Laws of the Sea (UNCLOS)". Vietnam also rejects the Chinese claim, citing that it is baseless and contrary to UNCLOS. In 2010, at a regional conference in Hanoi, former United States Secretary of State Hillary Clinton announced that "The United States has a national interest in freedom of navigation, open access to Asia's maritime commons, and respect for international law in the South China Sea". The United States has also called for unfettered access to the area that China claims as its own, and accused Beijing of adopting an increasingly aggressive stance on the high seas.

Parts of China's nine-dash line overlap Indonesia's exclusive economic zone near the Natuna islands. Indonesia believes China's claim over parts of the Natuna islands has no legal basis. In November 2015, Indonesia's security chief Luhut Binsar Pandjaitan said Indonesia could take China before an international court if Beijing's claim to the majority of the South China Sea and part of Indonesian territory is not resolved through dialogue. As early as 1958, the Chinese government released a document (with no official history context) pertaining to its territorial limits, stating that China's territorial waters cover twelve nautical miles, and announcing that this provision applies to "all the territory of People's Republic of China, including the Chinese mainland and offshore islands, Taiwan and its surrounding islands, the Penghu Islands, the Dongsha Islands, Xisha Islands, Zhongsha Islands, the Nansha Islands and other islands belonging to China".

Some parties have questioned the applicability of the United Nations Convention on the Law of the Sea to the dispute, arguing that the convention does not support claims based on sovereignty or title, and instead raises the right to continue using the waters for traditional purpose.

While China has never used the nine-dash line as an inviolable border to its sovereignty, this strategy together with the fact that China's government has never officially explained the meaning of the line has led many researchers to try to derive the exact meanings of the Nine-Dash Map in the Chinese strategy in the South China Sea. Some scholars believe that this line cannot be considered as a maritime boundary line because it violates maritime laws, which states that a national boundary line must be a stable and defined one. The nine-dash line is not stable because it has been reduced from eleven to nine dashes in the Gulf of Tonkin as endorsed by Zhou Enlai without any reasons given. It is also not a defined line because it does not have any specific geographic coordinates and does not tell how it can be connected if it was a continuous line.

A study of the Office of Ocean and Polar Affairs, US Department of State in 2014 said about a possible interpretation that "the placement of the dashes within open ocean space would suggest a maritime boundary or limit".

A 2012 Chinese eighth-grade geography textbook includes a map of China with the nine-dash line and the text "The southernmost point of our country's territory is Zengmu Ansha (James Shoal) in the Nansha Islands." Shan Zhiqiang, the executive chief editor of the Chinese National Geography magazine, wrote in 2013: "The nine-dashed line ... is now deeply engraved in the hearts and minds of the Chinese people." James Shoal is located roughly 133 nm south of Louisa Reef, which was previously claimed by Malaysia and, also claimed by Brunei, China, and Vietnam.

WikiLeaks released a diplomatic cable from September 2008, in which the United States Embassy in Beijing reported that a senior Chinese government maritime law expert said he was unaware of the historical basis for the nine dashes.

According to the Kyodo News, in March 2010, PRC officials told US officials that they consider the South China Sea a "core interest" on par with Taiwan, Tibet and Xinjiang, but subsequently backed away from that assertion. In July 2010, the Chinese Communist Party-controlled Global Times daily tabloid stated that "China will never waive its right to protect its core interest with military means", and a Ministry of Defense spokesman said that "China has indisputable sovereignty of the South Sea and China has sufficient historical and legal backing" to underpin its claims.

At the Conference on Maritime Study organised by the US-based Center for Strategic and International Studies (CSIS) in June 2011, Su Hao of the China Foreign Affairs University in Beijing delivered a speech on China's sovereignty and policy in the South China Sea, using history as the main argument. However, Termsak Chalermpalanupap, assistant director for Program Coordination and External Relations of the ASEAN Secretariat, said: "I don't think that the 1982 United Nations Convention on the Law of the Sea (UNCLOS) recognizes history as the basis to make sovereignty claims". Peter Dutton of the US Naval War College agreed, saying, "The jurisdiction over waters does not have connection to history. It must observe the UNCLOS." Dutton stressed that using history to explain sovereignty erodes the rules of the UNCLOS. It is understood that China ratified the UNCLOS in 1996.

Maritime researcher Carlyle Thayer, Emeritus Professor of Politics of the University of New South Wales, said that Chinese scholars using historical heritage to explain its claim of sovereignty shows the lack of legal foundation for the claim under international law. Caitlyn Antrim, executive director, Rule of Law Committee for the Oceans of the US, commented that "The U-shaped line has no ground under the international law because [the] historical basis is very weak". She added "I don't understand what China claims for in that U-shaped line. If they claim sovereignty over islands inside that line, the question is whether they are able to prove their sovereignty over these islands. If China claimed sovereignty over these islands 500 years ago and then they did not perform their sovereignty, their claim of sovereignty becomes very weak. For uninhabited islands, they can only claim territorial seas, not exclusive economic zones (EEZ) from the islands".

In 2022, Vietnam demanded that Taiwan stop conducting its military drills at the Spratly Islands, which is located within the South China Sea.

Arbitral tribunal's ruling 

In January 2013, the Philippines initiated arbitration proceedings against China under the United Nations Convention on the Law of the Sea (UNCLOS) over a range of issues, including the latter's historic rights claims inside the nine-dash line. A tribunal of arbitrators constituted under Annex VII of UNCLOS appointed the Permanent Court of Arbitration (PCA) as the registry to the proceedings.

On 12 July 2016, the tribunal ruled in favor of the Philippines on most of its submissions. While it would not "rule on any question of sovereignty over land territory and would not delimit any maritime boundary between the Parties", it concluded that China had not exercised exclusive control over the waters within the nine-dash line historically and has "no legal basis" to claim "historic rights" to the resources there. It also concluded that China's historic rights claims over the maritime areas (as opposed to land masses and territorial waters) inside the nine-dash line would have no lawful effect beyond what it is entitled to under the UNCLOS. China rejected the ruling, calling it "ill-founded"; its paramount leader Xi Jinping said that "China's territorial sovereignty and marine rights in the South China Sea will not be affected by the so-called Philippines South China Sea ruling in any way", but China was still "committed to resolving disputes" with its neighbours. China's grounds for rejecting the ruling include its decision to exclude itself from the compulsory arbitration provisions of UNCLOS when it ratified UNCLOS in 2006. Academic Graham Allison observed in 2016, "None of the five permanent members of the UN Security Council have ever accepted any international court's ruling when (in their view) it infringed their sovereignty or national security interests. Thus, when China rejects the Court's decision in this case, it will be doing just what the other great powers have repeatedly done for decades."

Taiwan, which currently administers Taiping Island, the largest of the Spratly Islands, also rejected the ruling and deployed a coast guard vessel to the island/rock, with a naval frigate mission also scheduled.

In media 
The DreamWorks Animation film Abominable included a scene with the nine-dash line, which generated controversy in Vietnam, Philippines and Malaysia although the film was simply depicting maps as sold in China. Vietnam and the Philippines banned the film, and Malaysia followed suit after the producers refused to cut the scene.

In 2019, an ESPN broadcast used a map that appeared to endorse China's claims to Taiwan and the nine-dash line, causing controversy.

In 2021, Netflix pulled TV series Pine Gap from Vietnam, following an order from the country's Authority of Broadcasting and Electronic Information, as a map with the nine-dash line was briefly shown in two episodes of the series. TV series Put Your Head on My Shoulder was also pulled from Vietnam, after the nine-dash line appeared briefly on the ninth episode of the series. The country's Authority of Broadcasting and Electronic Information released a statement that Netflix had angered and hurt the feelings of the entire people of Vietnam.

On 12 March 2022, Vietnam Film Authority banned the movie Uncharted because it contained an image of a nine-dash line map considered illegal. By April 27, the Philippines followed suit.

See also 

 Baselines of the Chinese territorial sea
 First island chain
 List of irredentist claims or disputes
 Territorial disputes in the South China Sea
Foreign policy of China
Great Wall of Sand

Notes

References

Citations

External links 
  - the published presentation notes, including supportive illustrations and footnotes for a presentation at the Philippine Institute for Marine and Ocean Affairs of the López Museum and Library (event release)

Territorial disputes of the Philippines
Territorial disputes of China
Territorial disputes of Malaysia
Territorial disputes of Vietnam
Territorial disputes of the Republic of China
South China Sea
Disputed territories in Southeast Asia
Chinese irredentism
Territorial disputes of Brunei